The Prussian T 37s were German steam locomotives operated by the Prussian state railways. They replaced the smaller  locomotives on the railway line between Beuthen and Kattowitz. In all 20 engines were supplied to Prussia, of which eight were taken over by the Reichsbahn and given numbers 99 401 to 99 408. They were all withdrawn by 1939 and scrapped.

These locomotives were equipped with Klien-Lindner axles at each end. They had an outside frame and the third wheelset was driven. They also had an outside Walschaerts valve gear. The engines could carry 1.3 tonnes of coal and 2.5 m2 of water. The coal tank was located behind the driver's cab.

See also
 List of Prussian locomotives and railcars
 Prussian state railways

References

0-8-0T locomotives
T 37
785 mm gauge locomotives
D n2t locomotives
Sächsische Maschinenfabrik locomotives
Orenstein & Koppel locomotives
Narrow gauge steam locomotives of Germany
Freight locomotives